Montenegrins (or ; lit. "Black Mountain People") are a South Slavic ethnic group that share a common Montenegrin culture, history, and language, identified with the country of Montenegro.

Genetics
According to one triple analysis – autosomal, mitochondrial and paternal — of available data from large-scale studies on Balto-Slavs and their proximal populations, the whole genome SNP data situates Montenegrins with Serbs in between two Balkan clusters. According to a 2020 autosomal marker analysis, Montenegrins are situated in-between Serbians and Kosovo Albanians.

Y-DNA genetic study done in 2010 on 404 male individuals from Montenegro gave the following results: haplogroup I2a (29.7%), E-V13 (26.9%), R1b (9.4%), R1a (7.6%), I1 (6.1%), J2a1 (4.7%), J2b (4.4%), G2a (2.4%), Q (1.9%), I2b (1.7%), N (1.4%), H (1.4%), L (1.2%), and J1 (0.49%). A 2022 study on 267 samples from northeastern Montenegro found that the "most common haplogroups are I2 and R1b, both identified in 23.97% of samples, followed by E (22.47%), J2 (11.61%), I1 (6.74%), G2 (3.75%), R1a (3.37%), I1 (1.12%), G (1.12%), N (0.75%), C (0.37%), T1 (0.37%) and Q1 (0.37%)".

History

Middle Ages

Slavs settled in the Balkans during the 6th and 7th centuries. According to De Administrando Imperio, there existed three Slavic polities on the territory of modern Montenegro: Duklja, roughly corresponding to the southern half; Travunia, the west; and Principality of Serbia, the north. Duklja emerged as an independent state during the 11th century, initially held by the Vojislavljević dynasty, later to be incorporated into the state of the Nemanjić dynasty. De Administrando Imperio also mentions that the area, along with the easternmost part of the Roman province of Dalmatia, has been mostly settled or ruled by Serbs.

By forming the first country under the rule of Časlav Klonimirović, with the centre in the old town of Ras, all these areas belonged to Serbian territory by conquest. By strengthening of the coastal Duklja and the noble family of Vojislavljević, in the beginning of the 11th century, they took power from Vlastimirovic dynasty, and soon after that, in 1077, Prince Mihailo Vojislavljević got the crown from the Pope and proclaimed the Kingdom of Duklja, with the centre in the city of Bar.

With the descent of Vojislavljević dynasty, nobleman Zavid Vukanović, from Ribnica near Podgorica, a cousin of Vojislavljević dynasty through a female line, had four sons. His youngest son, Stefan Nemanja, later became become the Grand Prince of the new Great Serbia, and the founder of the Serbian Orthodox Church among all Serbs. He moves to the city of Ras, where he overthrows (and kills) his eldest brother, Tihomir, in 1169, and declares himself the Grand Prince of Raška. After his proclamation, the last Prince/King of Duklja, Mihailo Vojislavljević, dies, and Stefan Nemanja joins Duklja and Raška, and soon he returns the rest of the lands from the period of Prince Časlav Klonimirović and King Mihailo Vojislavljević. From the reign of Stefan Nemanja to the fall of the Montenegrin medieval state, Duklja, by this time called Zeta, was a part of the united Great Serbia. Throughout the period of two centuries under the Nemanjić dynasty, Crnojević dynasty became a noble family, and later on the line of Crnojević was replaced by the family of Balšići, believed to be originating from France, who remain on the throne of the Zeta, by then known as Montenegro, until the fall of the Serbian state in 1459.

The region previously known as Duklja later became known as "Zeta". Between 1276 and 1309, Serbian queen Helen of Anjou, the widow of the Serbian King Stefan Uroš I, ruled Zeta, where she built and restored several monasteries, most notably the Monastery of Saints Sergius and Bacchus (Srđ and Vakh) on the Bojana river below Skadar (Shkodër). The Venetian name Montenegro, meaning "black mountain" occurred for the first time in the charter of St. Nicholas' monastery in Vranjina, dating to 1296, during Jelena's reign. Under King Stefan Milutin (reigned 1282-1321), at the beginning of the 14th century, the archdiocese in Bar was the biggest feudal domain in Zeta.

In the late 14th century, southern Montenegro (Zeta) came under the rule of the Balšić noble family, then the Crnojević noble family, and by the 15th century, Zeta was more often referred to as Crna Gora. The Crnojevići were driven out from Zeta by the Ottomans and forced to retreat above the Bay of Kotor where they built a monastery and a royal court in Cetinje, the future royal capital of Montenegro, before eventually fleeing to Venice. In 1496, the Ottomans conquered Zeta and subsequently established a sanjak that was subordinated to the Sanjak of Scutari. Ottoman influence remained largely limited to urban areas, while various tribes in the highlands emerged as districts out of reach of the Ottomans. These tribes were at times united against the Ottomans, under the leadership of the Metropolitans of Montenegro, the so-called "prince-bishops".

The Montenegrins maintained their de facto independence from the Ottoman Empire during the Ottoman's reign over most of the Balkan region (Bosnia, Serbia, Bulgaria, etc.). The Montenegrins were gathered around the Metropolitans of the Cetinje Metropolitanate, which led to further national awakening of the Montenegrins all around. The creation of a theocratic state and its advancement into a secular and independent country was even more evident in the late 15th and early 16th centuries.

19th century
The rule of the House of Petrović in the 18th and 19th century unified the Montenegrins and established strong ties with Russia and later with Serbia (under Ottoman occupation), with occasional help from the Austro-Hungarian Empire. That period was marked by numerous battles with Ottoman conquerors as well as by a firmer establishment of a self-governed principality.

In 1878, the Congress of Berlin recognised Montenegro as the 26th independent state in the world. Montenegro participated in the Balkan Wars of 1912–1913, as well as in World War I on the side of the Allies.

With the arrival of the Turks, because of the inaccessibility of the terrain, and because of the lack of interest of the Ottomans for the "Montenegrin karst and fracture" (inaccessible terrain), the tribes in Montenegro enjoyed more than autonomy, and less than independence, but even this did not prevent the Montenegrin tribes from raising various revolts against Turkish conquest . The people were divided into tribes, and shortly thereafter bloody accounts of "brotherly" tribes turned bloody. The most serious causes of these accidents were the lack of food in the then-Montenegro, and the few resources were left, were taken away by the Turks, and the conflicts were inevitable. At the beginning of the 18th century. From then on, to Prince Danilo Petrovic, Montenegrins are under the theocratic rule of the Petrović dynasty. Due to the impossibility of approach, due to the terrain of Montenegro, Bishop Petar I Petrović Njegoš cursed the tribes he was ruling, using their piety to inspire unity, and thus attempted to prevent the further slaughter of the fraternal people. After his death in 1830, Petar of Cetinje was buried in Cetinje Monastery and was proclaimed a saint.

His adopted son Petar II Petrović Njegoš ruled from 1830 until 1851. It is recorded as one of the greatest educators of the Serbian people in general. He wrote one of the most important works of the romantic epoch "Mountain Wreath" (regarded as one of the artistic foundations of Serbian nationalism), and he was also credited with bringing the final look of a Montenegrin hat, which is decorated with a black frame and represents the crown, more precisely, sorrow for the slavery of the Serbian people under Ottoman yoke. The top of the cap is red, symbolising blood, where 5 golden threads are engraved, thought to signify 5 centuries of slavery under the Turks. Within these golden threads there is a "Cross" with four Cyrillic letters (scores) S, a variant of the Byzantine Palaiologos tetragrammic cross, sometimes referred to as the variant of the Serbian cross.

He ruled as a bishop, but he also stood firm to see that Montenegro must be modernised. He built schools, roads, raised the Church, expanded the capital of Cetinje. After his death and funeral, he was succeeded by his nephew Prince Danilo Petrović who ruled as the first secular ruler, with the title of Knjaz. Since then, Knjaževina (Principality) of Montenegro was no longer a Prince-Bishopric, but a secular monarchy. This led to the opinion of the Turkish court that this change can lead to a major change in Montenegro, and a desire for "independence". In 1852, Omer-pasha sent a large army against the Montenegrins. A small Montenegrin army led by Prince Danilo's brother, Duke (Vojvoda) Mirko, defended 30 remaining fighters in the monastery of the Serbian Orthodox Church, Ostrog for 9 days. This is taken as the greatest heroic force of the people in those areas. One year later, Omer-pasha again tried to conquer Montenegro, but with the great heroism of Vojvoda Mirko, the Montenegrins performed the greatest victory over the Ottomans in the new century, after which Montenegro gained essential autonomy, the highest degree to independence, and a few decades later, full independence. Prince Danilo dies in 1860, and Danilo's adoptive son came to the throne, biological son of Vojvoda Mirko, Nikola Petrović. He remained remembered in Montenegro as the greatest ruler, owing in large part to the fact that he was the first modern-day King of Montenegro and that it was under him that Montenegro's independence had been recognised. He is of great importance for the Montenegrin people in general, because he has fought against the Ottomans in the territory of Montenegro, Herzegovina, and Bosnia, and the people often called him "Emperor of the Heroes". Immediately after coming to power, a war for the liberation of the Montenegrin people in Herzegovina started in 1862, in which Principality of Montenegro entered, but later it turned out that she entered extremely unprepared and soon after that peace was made. After returning from Russia, the then emperor Alexander II enlightened him, and immediately upon his arrival he began to work hard for the urbanisation of the country. He revised the army completely, built many courts and schools, and Montenegro began to look like a European state. In 1876, with the Principality of Serbia and the Obrenović dynasty, he started a war, in history known as "War for the Liberation of the Serbian People".

A couple of years before the war, Prince Nikola Petrović with the Serbian prince Mihailo Obrenović made an alliance in Venice, where beside the military alliance, a contract was signed on the dynastic heritage of the new future unified joint state. It was said that the plan is for Serbia to go back to its historical borders (On the management of the Empire) from the Timok River to the Una peak. The Montenegrin federal unit would be an integral part of the new common state, and in it Petrović dynasty would have the title of the princes, while the Obrenović dynasty would wear a royal crown. The Montenegrins performed great victories, and by the end of the war at the Berlin Congress in 1878, the Principality of Montenegro received recognized independence, and became an internationally recognized state. This act raised the then two Serbian states to the ranks of independence, and it meant encouragement for all Serbs to completely resist the Turkish occupation in all Serbian countries. After the war, Prince Nikola wrote all his famous works, and the most famous work is the folk anthem "Onamo' namo! ", According to many, the most beautiful Serbian song about Kosovo. In 1910, then Prince Nikola, with the permission of the great powers of the Kingdom of Serbia and King Peter, proclaimed another Serbian kingdom in the Balkans: the Kingdom of Montenegro. The flag of the new state has become a flagrant national flag (a Serbian tricolor with the coat of arms of Petrović-Njegos dynasty), while with the old flag, it is equally used in the people and the popular "crusader" flag of Montenegrins. Knjazevina (Principality) of Montenegro, with the address of Russia, announces the war on Japan. Naturally, the participation of Montenegrins in this war was more symbolic, as the gratitude of Montenegro to Russia for generous help. In the Balkan Wars, the Kingdom of Montenegro and the Kingdom of Serbia participated in the liberation battles in the old Serbia (Kosovo, Metohija, and Raška) and Macedonia. Thus, a common border was established between the two new-age "Serb" states, and the dream of King Nikola about the liberation of the "Serbian cradle" (Kosovo) was realised. At the beginning of the First World War, Montenegro immediately declared war on Austria-Hungary, after Serbia, but in 1916 it had to capitulate after all forces held a rally on the direction of Serbian withdrawal through Albania. After the passage of the Serbian government and the king, the crushed Montenegrin army sacrificed itself for the future of the Serbian state. King Nikola, already ill and in his late years, left his homeland. He went to France, where he died.

Yugoslav era

After the liberation of the Serbian and other Yugoslav (South Slavic) peoples, the Kingdom of Serbs, Croats and Slovenes was proclaimed, but the "Venetian Agreement" between the then Prince Nikola and Prince Mihailo Obrenović was breached. With the unification with the Kingdom of Serbia, Montenegro was to have autonomy under the prince's dynasty Petrović-Njegoš. Due to this act, the Montenegrin public was divided on two sides. The first, majority party, better known as Bjelaši ("The Whites"), advocated unconditional unification with the Serbian Kingdom under the Karađorđević dynasty, while Zelenaši ("The Greens"), in a minority, advocated a conditional union that would respect the Venice Treaty. In Podgorica on October 26, 1918, the Podgorica Assembly unanimously voted that Montenegro unconditionally unite with Serbia into Yugoslavia, without any autonomy. Due to this decision, the few Greens were persecuted, and their rebellion was suppressed in the coming years. In 1929, with the proclamation of the Zeta Banovina with its headquarters in Podgorica, the territory of the former Montenegro with eastern Herzegovina and Metohija gained autonomy in the form of banovina (province), and the ruler of the region became a ban, whom the king personally appoints. King Aleksandar Karađorđević ordered the construction of a chapel in Lovćen in 1925, and the remains of, as many would say, "the wisest Serb" Prince-Bishop Petar II Petrović Njegoš were transferred there in a grandiose ceremony. At the beginning of the Second World War, the army in the Zeta Banovina area enjoyed great success against the Italian army of occupation, expelling the Italian army to Shkodra in Albania. After the breakup of the Yugoslav state, Montenegro got a puppet government led by Sekula Drljević, who would be expelled from the country later.

Montenegro unconditionally joined Serbia on November 26, 1918 in a controversial decision of the Podgorica Assembly, and soon afterwards became a part of the Kingdom of Serbs, Croats, and Slovenes, later renamed Yugoslavia. A number of Montenegrin chieftains, disappointed by the effective disappearance of Montenegro, which they perceived to have resulted from political manipulation, rose up in arms during January 1919 in an uprising known as the Christmas Rebellion, which was crushed in a severe, comprehensive military campaign by 1922–23. Annexation of the Kingdom of Montenegro on November 13, 1918 gained international recognition only at the Conference of Ambassadors in Paris, held on July 13, 1922. In 1929 the newly renamed Kingdom of Yugoslavia was reorganised into provinces (banovine) one of which, Zeta Banovina, encompassed the old Kingdom of Montenegro and had Cetinje as its administrative centre.

Between the two world wars, the Communist Party of Yugoslavia opposed the Yugoslav monarchy and its unification policy, and supported Montenegrin autonomy, gaining considerable support in Montenegro. During World War II, many Montenegrins joined the Yugoslav partisan forces, although the portion joining the chetniks was also significant. One third of all officers in the partisan army were Montenegrins. They also gave a disproportionate number of highest-ranked party officials and generals. During WWII Italy occupied Montenegro (in 1941) and annexed to the Kingdom of Italy the area of Kotor, where there was a small Roman community (descendants from the populations of the renaissance-era Albania Veneta).

When the second Yugoslavia was formed in 1945, the Communists who led the Partisans during the war formed the new régime. They recognised, sanctioned, and fostered a national identity of Montenegrins as a people distinct from the Serbs and other South Slavs. The number of people who were registered as Montenegrins in Montenegro was 90% in 1948; it had been dropping since, to 62% in 1991. With the rise of Serbian nationalism in the late 80's the number of citizens who declared themselves Montenegrin dropped sharply from 61.7%, in the 1991 census, to 43.16% in 2003. For a detailed overview of these trends, see the Demographic history of Montenegro.

Though Montenegrins comprised one of the smallest ethnic groups in the state (2.5% in 1971), they were by far the most overrepresented ethnic group in the Yugoslav bureaucracy, military, and communist party organs. In the Yugoslav People's Army (JNA), 19% of general officers and 30% of colonels were ethnic Montenegrins. Among party elites, Montenegrins made up 16% to 21% of senior officials throughout the existence of communist Yugoslavia, and comprised a similar portion of the state's diplomatic corps. The striking overrepresentation among elites, which has been compared  to the role of senior Austrian officers and officials in Nazi Germany, has partly been attributed to the pre-war strength of the Communist Party of Montenegro, the high proportion of Montenegrins among partisan commanders and central committee members during the war, and a historically militaristic culture. During this period, ethnic Montenegrins also held about 15% of government jobs in Yugoslavia.

Initially, after the fall of Communism in the early 1990s, the idea of a distinct Montenegrin ethnic identity had been taken over by independence-minded Montenegrins. The ruling Democratic Party of Socialists (DPS) (rebranded Communist Party), led by Prime Minister Milo Đukanović and President Momir Bulatović, was firmly allied with Slobodan Milošević throughout this period and opposed such movements.

During the Bosnian War and Croatian War (1991–1995) Montenegro participated with its police and paramilitary forces in the attacks on Dubrovnik and Bosnian towns along with Serbian troops. It conducted persecutions against Bosniak refugees who were arrested by the Montenegrin police and transported to Serb camps in Foča, where they were executed.

Seeking independence
At the beginning of the Yugoslav crisis in the 1990s, the Yugoslav People's Army was trying to prevent the break up of Yugoslavia by military attacks. Part of the army from the then SR of Montenegro was attacking Herzegovina and Dubrovnik, and kept Dubrovnik under siege for almost eight months. In this period, the Montenegrins had an old sense of national affiliation, and at a referendum almost 100% of the respondents voted to declare that they wanted to stay in the Yugoslav rump state, the Federal Republic of Yugoslavia. During the siege of Dubrovnik, the Serbian (Montenegrin) paramilitary formation invented the saying: "From Lovćen a fairy salutes, where are you Serbian Dubrovnik!" (Serbian: "Са Ловћена вила кличе, ђе си српски Дубровниче!"), which has been taken many times as a verse with a negative connotation, because of the city being besieged for such a long time. After the abolition of communism and the creation of a new state, the federal unit of the Republic of Montenegro received a new flag and the coat-of-arms, where the flag was a classic Montenegrin national flag (a Serbian tricolour with blue colour), while the coat of arms of the Coat of Arms was taken from the historical emblem of Petrović. Then, the great fighters for the joint FRY, Momir Bulatović and Milo Đukanović, together with Slobodan Milošević, ruled the state union. The paths of Milo Đukanović and Momir Bulatović diverged before the start of the NATO bombing of Yugoslavia, and Milo Đukanović begins to change attitudes drastically, starting first with the political attitudes and afterwards the national and religious. In 1997 a full-blown rift occurred within DPS, and Đukanović's faction won over Bulatović's, who formed a new Socialist People's Party of Montenegro (SNP). The DPS distanced itself from Milošević and gradually took over the independence idea from the Liberal Alliance of Montenegro and the SDP, and has won all elections since. In the fall of 1999, shortly after the NATO bombing of Yugoslavia, the Đukanović-led Montenegrin leadership came out with a platform for the re-definition of relations within the federation that called for more Montenegrin involvement in the areas of defence and foreign policy, though the platform fell short of pushing for independence. After Milošević's overthrow on October 5, 2000, Đukanović for the first time came out in support of full independence. Montenegro started increasingly moving away from Serbia, and in 2003, the Parliament of Montenegro sought amendments to the Constitution. With these amendments, the Federal Unit of Montenegro was allowed to call a referendum on independence, which took place on 21 May 2006.

When the referendum was announced, independence was obtained by a narrow majority. However, the bar was set high in order to avoid any dispute after the vote, with the requirement for a 55% of votes in favour of independence. Since the proclamation of independence, the policy of making a new ethnic identity is even more intensified by official government policy, often used for political purposes, whereas the citizens still remain divided on the issue of ethnic identity.

Demographics

In the 2011 census, around 280,000 or 44.98% of the population of Montenegro identified themselves as ethnic Montenegrins, while around 180,000 or 28.73% identified themselves as Serbs. The number of "Montenegrins", "Serbs" and "Bosniaks" fluctuates from census to census, not due to real demographic changes, but due to changes in how people self-identify nationally. According to the Serbian 2011 census, there are 38,527 ethnic Montenegrins in Serbia, accounting for 0.54% of its population. In addition, a significant number of Serbs in Serbia and Bosnia and Herzegovina are of Montenegrin ancestry, but exact numbers are difficult to assess – the inhabitants of Montenegro contributed greatly to the repopulation of a depopulated Serbia after two rebellions against the Ottoman Empire in the early 19th century. On 19 October 2007, Montenegro adopted a new Constitution which proclaimed Montenegrin (a standardized variety of Serbo-Croatian) as the official language of Montenegro.

The term "Montenegrins" in a wider sense can also be used to denote all residents of Montenegro, regardless of their national and religious affiliation.

Language

Montenegrins speak Montenegrin and Serbian, an Ijekavian variant of the Shtokavian dialect of the pluricentric Serbo-Croatian language. Neo-shtokavian Eastern-Herzegovinian sub-dialect is spoken in the North-West (largest city Nikšić), and old shtokavian Zeta sub-dialect is spoken in the rest of Montenegro, including capital Podgorica and the Old Royal Capital of Cetinje, and eastern Sanjak. 

The Zeta dialect features additional sounds: a voiceless alveolo-palatal fricative, voiced alveolo-palatal fricative *((occurring in other jekavian dialects as well) and a voiced alveolar affricate (shared with other old-štokavian dialects). Both sub-dialects are characterised by highly specific accents (shared with other old-štokavian dialects) and several "hyper-ijekavisms" (i.e. nijesam, where the rest of shtokavian area uses nisam) and "hyper-iotations" (đevojka for djevojka, đeca for djeca etc.) (these features, especially the hyper-iotation, are more prominent in the Zeta sub-dialect), that are common in all Montenegrin vernaculars.

On the sociolinguistic level, the language has been classified as a dialect of Serbo-Croat. The Montenegrin constitution currently defines Montenegrin as the official language. Since the campaign for independence, a movement for recognition of the Montenegrin language as wholly separate from Serbian and other standard variants of Serbo-Croat (Bosnian, Croatian) has emerged, finding the basis for separate language identity mostly in the above-mentioned dialectal specifics. In the 2011 census, 42.88% of Montenegrin citizens stated that they speak the Serbian language, while 36.97% stated that they speak Montenegrin. Most of the young people under 18 in Montenegro, 39.23 percent, say they speak Montenegrin, while 37.47% call their mother tongue Serbian, as shown in the census held from 1 to 15 April 2011.

Religion

Most Montenegrins are Eastern Orthodox, primarily adhering to the Serbian Orthodox Church while a minority adhere to the Montenegrin Orthodox Church, which is not canonically recognised by the Eastern Orthodox Church. The former predominantly belong to the Metropolitanate of Montenegro and the Littoral of the Serbian Orthodox Church as well as its four other eparchies (dioceses) that are active in parts of Montenegro and neighbouring countries, namely the Eparchy of Budimlja and Nikšić, the Eparchy of Mileševa, and the Eparchy of Zahumlje and Herzegovina.

According to the census of 2011, people that declared Montenegrin as their ethnicity declared the following religious identity: 
Eastern Orthodox: 248,523 (88.7%)
Islam: 12,931 (4.6%)
Catholic: 5,667 (2.0%)
Protestantism: 921 (0.3%)
Atheism/Agnosticism: 6,393 (2.3%)
Others: 5,883 (2.1%)

Culture

The most important dimension of Montenegrins' culture is the ethical ideal of Čojstvo i junaštvo, roughly translated as "Chivalry and Bravery". Another result of its centuries-long warrior history, is the unwritten code of Chivalry that Marko Miljanov, one of the most famous warriors in his time, tried to describe in his book Primjeri čojstva i junaštva (Examples of Humanity and Bravery) at the end of the 19th century. Its main principles stipulate that to deserve a true respect of its people, a warrior has to show virtues of integrity, dignity, humility, self-sacrifice for the just cause if necessary, respect for others, and rectitude, along with the bravery. In the old days of battle, it resulted in Montenegrins fighting to the death, since being captured was considered the greatest shame. Miljanov defined the two characteristics in a maxim roughly translated as: "Bravery is when I defend myself from the other, chivalry is when I defend the other from myself" ("Junaštvo je kada sebe branim od drugoga, čojstvo je kada drugoga branim od sebe").

This ethos is still an important part of most Montenegrins' ethical belief system, and understanding it is essential in order to understand Montenegrin identity and self-perception. Most of extraordinary examples of Montenegrin conduct during its long history can be traced to the code.

Montenegrins' long-standing history of fighting for independence is invariably linked with strong traditions of folk epic poetry. A prominent feature of Montenegrin culture is the gusle, a one-stringed instrument played by a story-teller who sings or recites stories of heroes and battles in decasyllabic verse. These traditions are stronger in the northern parts of the country and are also shared with people in eastern Herzegovina, western Serbia, northern Albania, and central Dalmatia.

On the substratum of folk epic poetry, poets like Petar II Petrović Njegoš, widely considered the most one of the most brilliant Montenegrins and Southern Slavs in history, have created their own expression. Njegoš's epic book Gorski Vijenac (The Mountain Wreath) presents the central point of Montenegrin culture as struggle for freedom.

On the other hand, Adriatic cities like Herceg-Novi, Kotor, and Budva had strong trading and maritime traditions, and were more open for Venetian, Ragusan, and other Catholic influences. Possession of those cities often changed, but their population was basically a mixture of people with Orthodox and Catholic religions and traditions. These cities were incorporated into Montenegro only after the fall of Austria-Hungary. In those cities, stronger influences of medieval and renaissance architecture, painting, and lyric poetry can be found, and while the adherence to the principles of chivalry and bravery are part of their ethos they are usually less central than in the areas of "old Montenegro".

Identity and anthropology

Slavs have lived in the area of Montenegro since the 6th and 7th centuries in the medieval state of Duklja. By the 14th century, the mountains behind the Gulf of Kotor were coming to be referred to as "Montenegro" (Montenegrin: Crna Gora; literally translates as “Black Mountain”), and by the 15th century, the name was coming to increasingly replace the older name, Zeta. Since the end of the 17th century, Montenegro existed as a de facto independent country, first as a theocratic Prince-Bishopric (1694–1852), then as a secular Principality (1852–1910) and finally as a Kingdom (1910–1918). After the end of World War I, Montenegro was incorporated into the Kingdom of Yugoslavia, thus losing its statehood. This led to a short-lived Christmas Uprising of 1919, between supporters of Petrović-Njegoš dynasty and Montenegrin statehood and proponents of unification with Serbia and Yugoslavia under the Karađorđević dynasty. After the World War II, Montenegro regained its political sovereignty, becoming one of the six constituent republics of the SFR Yugoslavia, and Montenegro's sovereignty was recognised once again. A portion of Montenegrins declares as ethnic Serbs, while a larger proportion of citizens of Montenegro identifies ethnically as Montenegrin, a division that was exacerbated with the fall of socialism. This division has deepened further since the movement for full Montenegrin independence from the Federal Republic of Yugoslavia began to gain ground in 1991, while full independence was regained after the 2006 referendum.

Vlahović (2008) noted many anthropological studies which showed that Montenegrin people have strong Dinaric type (with seaboard, central, Durmitor, mountain and other subtypes) autochthonous on the Dinaric Alps since the Mesolithic period. Dinaric peoples, including Montenegrins, are among the tallest people in the world. The type, particularly in Montenegro, is distinguished by brachiochepal shape, broad forehead, wide relief and strong face, wide jaw and noticeably flat notched head, while arms and legs are proportional to the body height. Hair is commonly of black color, with black or blue eyes.

Anthropologist Božina Ivanović considered that the development of the Montenegrin Dinaric variety was influenced by gracilisation and brachycephalisation; they have characteristics which were not found in other Slavic and non-Slavic European populations, nor morphological properties from paleo-anthropological series originating from the Slavic necropolis from other South Slavic area. Also, the brachycephalisation and width of the face in the last five centuries is growing in Montenegrin, while among other Slavic and European communities decreasing, showing anthropological issues in Montenegro have deeper roots and broader scientific importance. Montenegrin historian Dragoje Živković (1989) noted that modern multidisciplinary research disagrees with older consideration how Sklavinias and Slavic states had ethnical identification, example Serb ethnos, until the 12th century. Slavs mixing with native population (in case of Komani culture necropolis in Pukë) made a new cultural-historical drift of Albanian-Illyrian and Slavic built upon extinct and present La Tène, Greek-Illyrian, Illyrian-Roman, and Byzantine. He argued that the Slavs from Duklja promptly blended in social-economical of the natives who historically had a more developed society, as was in their interest to approach the Roman-Illyrian natives.

Notable Montenegrins

Historiography

See also
 Montenegrins in Albania
 Montenegrin American
 Montenegrin Argentine
 Montenegrin Australian
 Montenegrins of Bosnia and Herzegovina
 Montenegrin Canadian
 Montenegrins of Croatia
 Montenegrins in Germany
 Montenegrins of Kosovo
 Montenegrins of Serbia
 Montenegrins of Vojvodina

Notes

References

Sources

External links

 Matica crnogorska (official pages)
 Montenegrin Academy of Sciences and Arts (official pages)
 The Montenegrin Association of America
 Špiro Kulišić: O Etnogenezi Crnogoraca (On Ethnogenesis of Montenegrins) (in Montenegrin)
 Article about Montenegrin tribes (in montenegrin language)

 
Slavic ethnic groups
South Slavs
Ethnic groups in the Balkans
Ethnic groups in Montenegro
Ethnic groups in Serbia
Ethnic groups in Croatia
Ethnic groups in Bosnia and Herzegovina